This list of museums in Western Australia contains museums which are defined for this context as institutions (including nonprofit organizations, government entities, and private businesses) that collect and care for objects of cultural, artistic, scientific, or historical interest and make their collections or related exhibits available for public viewing. Also included are non-profit art galleries and university art galleries.

Defunct museums
 Museum of Western Australia Sports

See also
List of museums in Australia

References

Western Australia

Museums
Museums